Coenzyme Q5, methyltransferase, more commonly known as COQ5, is an enzyme involved in the electron transport chain.  COQ5 is located within the mitochondrial matrix and is a part of the biosynthesis of ubiquinone.

Function 

COQ5 has the role of catalyst in the C-methylation in the coenzyme Q biosynthesis, on the benzoic ring of CoQ6, the biosynthetic intermediate, in both in humans and yeast Saccharomyces cerevisiae. COQ5 is one of the eleven polypeptides in yeast, that are essential for Q production. Moreover, it assembles with the CoQ-synthome, a multi-subunit complex. In humans, primary Q deficiency happens due to many COQ genes mutating. And diseases such as mitochondrial, cardiovascular, kidney and neurodegenerative diseases, are results of the decrease in Q biosynthesis. Development of soluble COQ5 proteins can be applied to other mitochondrial proteins. Coenzyme Q10 Deficiency is associated with COQ5.  Therefore, to maintain CoQ10 levels in human cells, COQ5 is required.

Catalytic activity 

Catalyzes C-methylation and ubiquinone biosynthetic process.

Mechanism 

COQ5 is an S-adenosyl methionine (SAM)-dependent methyltransferase (SAM-MTase) catalyzing the C-methylation step, converting 2-methoxy-6-polyprenyl-1,4-benzoquinone (DDMQH2) to 2-methoxy-5-methyl-6-polyprenyl-1,4-benzoquinone (DMQH2) in the CoQ6 biosynthesis pathway.

In the catalytic mechanism of COQ5, based on the structural analyses, as the first step, before methyl transfer, Arg201 abstracts a hydrogen from the water molecule, forming a negatively charged oxygen atom which deprotonates the C5 atom of DDMQH2. Looking at the DDMQH2 substrate and Asn202, the hydroxyl group on the C4 atom and the side chain forms a hydrogen bond which leads to the formation of the O4′ anion. The stability of the C5 anion is a result of the negative charge being delocalized on the π bond conjugation system. Tyr78 acts as a catalytic base and Tyr78, Arg201 and Asn202 are invariant in COQ5 homologues.

References 

Transferases